Alfred Ernest Jones (27 May 1885 – 19 February 1929) was an Australian rules footballer who played for the Melbourne Football Club in the Victorian Football League (VFL). Midway through 1910 he was cleared to Brighton in the Victorian Football Association (VFA).

Notes

External links 

 

1885 births
1929 deaths
Australian rules footballers from Geelong
Melbourne Football Club players
Brighton Football Club players